Gordon Pall (26 December 1907 – December 1987) was a Canadian mathematician.  In 1945, he and Lloyd Williams founded the Canadian Mathematical Congress.

Education and career
Gordon Pall got a B.A. at the University of Manitoba in 1926, an M,A. at the University of Toronto in 1927, and a Ph.D. in 1929 under Leonard Eugene Dickson with the dissertation "Problems in Additive Theory of Numbers" at the University of Chicago, Ph.D., 1929.

In 1931, he became a Lecturer in Mathematics at McGill University, becoming an Assistant Professor in 1934.  In 1946, he was appointed to a professorship at Illinois Institute of Technology.

Selected publications
 On Generalized Quaternions Transactions of the American Mathematical Society, 59 (1946), pp. 280-332
 Discriminantal Divisors of Binary Quadratic Forms, Journal of Number Theory, Vol 1, Issue 4, October 1969, Pages 525-533

References

External links
 

Academic staff of McGill University
Illinois Institute of Technology faculty
University of Chicago alumni
University of Manitoba alumni
University of Toronto alumni
20th-century Canadian mathematicians
Number theorists
1907 births
1987 deaths